Thermoanaerobacter ethanolicus is a species of thermophilic, anaerobic, non-spore-forming bacteria.

The bacteria were first isolated from hot springs in Yellowstone National Park. The bacteria ferment sugars into ethanol and carbon dioxide more than other anaerobes, hence the species name ethanolicus. The growth range of T. ethanolicus is 37-77°C and pH 4.4-9.9, with the optimum growth temperature at around 70°C.

References

External links
Type strain of Thermoanaerobacter ethanolicus at BacDive -  the Bacterial Diversity Metadatabase

Thermoanaerobacterales
Thermophiles
Anaerobes
Bacteria described in 1982